The AO-63 is a Soviet two-barrel AK derived assault rifle chambered for the 5.45×39mm round. It was designed by Sergei Simonov and Peter Tkachev, and manufactured by TsNIITochMash. It uses a side-by-side barrel configuration, and it can reach a maximum rate of fire of 6000 rounds/min when fired in two-round burst mode with a 0.01 second delay to increase ballistic performance, making it technically the fastest-firing rifle known.

Development
The AO-63 assault rifle was used by the Spetsnaz during the Abakan trials in May/June 1986, in search of a more accurate alternative to replace the standard issue AK-74. It was described in the official report as being highly accurate as well as simple and reliable; despite its accuracy and performance, it was later dropped out of the competition for unknown reasons, with the AN-94 emerging victorious.

Overview
The AO-63 is a gas-operated, 5.45×39mm caliber, twin-barrel assault rifle derived from the Kalashnikov rifle. The weapon has side-by-side barrels with the right barrel predominant, twin rotating bolts/gas pistons and ejects from both sides. The trigger group has a 3-position selector on the right side of the receiver; the first is semi-auto firing one barrel, the second in full auto firing both barrels with a 0.01 second delay, the third is unique as at first it fires a two-round 6000rpm burst then one barrel in 850rpm full auto. The magazine is unusual as it has the main double column holding 30 rounds with a single column holding 15 rounds.

References

AO-63 assault rifle video
AO-63 assault rifle

Ружье" 1_1998 "Эйнштейн, Чехов и Платон?
Oruzhie magazine, Pages 6/7/8, Issue No1 1998.

5.45×39mm assault rifles
Assault rifles of the Soviet Union
Multiple-barrel firearms
Kalashnikov derivatives
Trial and research firearms of the Soviet Union
TsNIITochMash products